Pachpadra is a village in Barmer district in Indian state of  Rajasthan. It is a tehsil headquarter.

One of the famous attractions in the city is the Pachpadra Lake, which is known for salt collection around it. There is one Jawahar Navodaya Vidyalaya also, which will be only one in a district.

Demographics
Population of Pachpadra according to the Indian census 2011 is 9191, male population is 4736 and female population is 4455 .

References

 Pachpadra Geographic details

External links
 JNV Pachpadra
 pachpadra.com
 HPCL RAJASTHAN REFINERY LIMITED

Villages in Barmer district
Salt industry in India
Tehsils of Barmer  district